2005–06 Hong Kong Second Division League was the 92nd season of Hong Kong Second Division League.

Teams
Derico
Double Flower
Eastern
Fire Services
Fukien
Hong Kong Football Club
Korchina
Kwai Tsing
Kwok Keung
Lucky Mile	浩運
New Fair Kui Tan
Tai Po
Tung Po

Final league table

Top scorers

References

Hong Kong Second Division League seasons
Hong Kong
2